John Carrington Cox is the Nomura Professor of Finance at the MIT Sloan School of Management. He is one of the world's leading experts on options theory and one of the inventors of the Cox–Ross–Rubinstein model for option pricing, as well as of the Cox–Ingersoll–Ross model for interest rate dynamics.  He was named Financial Engineer of the Year by the International Association of Financial Engineers in 1998.

References

External links 
 Webpage at MIT

1943 births
Living people
Academics from Houston
Financial economists
MIT Sloan School of Management faculty
Fellows of the Econometric Society
Economists from Texas
21st-century American economists